Frank Russell Woodward (May 17, 1894 – June 11, 1961) was a professional baseball pitcher. He played all or part of five seasons in Major League Baseball between 1918 and 1923 for the Philadelphia Phillies, St. Louis Cardinals, Washington Senators, and Chicago White Sox.

References

External links

Major League Baseball pitchers
Philadelphia Phillies players
St. Louis Cardinals players
Washington Senators (1901–1960) players
Chicago White Sox players
New Britain Sinks players
New Haven Murlins players
Seattle Rainiers players
New Haven Weissmen players
New Haven Indians players
Worcester Panthers players
New Haven Profs players
Baseball players from New Haven, Connecticut
1894 births
1961 deaths